Neoeburia turuna is a species of beetle in the family Cerambycidae, the only species in the genus Neoeburia.

References

Eburiini